Grenada competed at the 2022 Commonwealth Games held in Birmingham, England from 28 July to 8 August 2022. It was Grenada's 11th appearance at the Commonwealth Games.

Medalists

Competitors
The following is the list of number of competitors participating at the Games per sport/discipline.

Athletics

Men
Track and road events

Field events

Combined events – Decathlon

Boxing

Men

Cycling

Road
Men

Track
Points race

Scratch race

Swimming

Men

Women

References

External links
Birmingham 2022 Commonwealth Games Official site

2022
Nations at the 2022 Commonwealth Games
Commonwealth Games